Alexander Findlay (26 December 1902 – October 1985) was a Scottish professional footballer who played as a inside right. He made appearances in the English Football League for Bristol Rovers and Wrexham.

He also played for Musselburgh Bruntonians, Cheltenham Town, Gloucester City and Evesham Town.

Personal life
Findlay's older brother Bill was also a professional footballer, who played in the English Football League for Leicester City and Watford.

References

1902 births
1985 deaths
Scottish footballers
Association football forwards
English Football League players
Musselburgh Athletic F.C. players
Bristol Rovers F.C. players
Wrexham A.F.C. players
Cheltenham Town F.C. players
Gloucester City A.F.C. players
Evesham Town F.C. players